This is a list of roads designated A9.

 A009 road (Argentina), a road in the northeast of Santa Fe Province
 A9 highway (Australia) may refer to :
 A9 (Sydney), a road linking Windsor and Campbelltown
 A9 highway (South Australia), a limited-access road connecting Port Adelaide and major interstate routes to Perth and Sydney
 A9 highway (Tasmania), a road connecting Sorell and Port Arthur 
 A9 motorway (Austria), a road connecting the A1 and  A8 junction and the A1 border with Slovenia
 A9 road (China) may refer to :
 A9 expressway (Shanghai), a controlled-access highway connecting A20 Huqingping Interchange and Jiangsu Province Boundary
 A9 (Croatia), a road connecting Pula, Croatia with the A8 motorway and the border with Slovenia
 A9 motorway (Cyprus), a road connecting Nicosia with the Troodos Mountains
 A9 autoroute (France), a road connecting Orange and Perthus
 Bundesautobahn 9 (Germany), a road connecting Berlin and Munich
 Autostrada A9 (Italy), a road connecting the A8 motorway at Lainate, near Milan with Como and Chiasso at the border with Switzerland
 A9 road (Latvia), a road connecting Riga and Liepāja 
 A9 highway (Lithuania), a road connecting Panevėžys and Sitkūnai
 A9 motorway (Netherlands), a motorway in the Netherlands from Diemen to Alkmaar
 A9 highway (Nigeria), a road connecting Kano and Katsina to the NIger border
 Autopista AP-9, a road connecting the Portugal border and a junction with the Autovía A-52
 A9 highway (Sri Lanka), a road connecting Kandy and Jaffna
 A9 road (British Isles) may refer to :
 A9 road (Isle of Man), a road connecting Ramsey and Andreas
 A9 road (Scotland), a road connecting Edinburgh to Thurso
 A9 road (United States of America) may refer to :
 County Route A9 (California), a road in Tehama County
 A9 Road (Zimbabwe)

See also
 List of highways numbered 9